The Calico Rock Home Economics Building is a historic school building on 2nd Street in Calico Rock, Arkansas. It is a single-story stone structure with a gable roof and a concrete foundation. It was built in 1940 by crews funded by the National Youth Administration (NYA), who ranged in age from 15 to 18 and were paid 9 cents per hour. The building includes four kitchen areas, a central work area, and restrooms. It is virtually unaltered from its original construction except for the replacement of windows.

The building was listed on the National Register of Historic Places in 1992.

See also
National Register of Historic Places listings in Izard County, Arkansas

References

School buildings on the National Register of Historic Places in Arkansas
Buildings and structures in Izard County, Arkansas
National Register of Historic Places in Izard County, Arkansas
School buildings completed in 1940
1940 establishments in Arkansas
National Youth Administration